Dospineşti may refer to several villages in Romania:

 Dospineşti, a village in Buhoci Commune, Bacău County
 Dospineşti, a village in Vișinești Commune, Dâmboviţa County